Rechitsa is a rural locality in Gorodensky Selsoviet Rural Settlement, Lgovsky District, Kursk Oblast, Russia. Population:

Geography 
The village is located on the Sukhaya Rechitsa River (a right tributary of the Seym), 56 km from the Russia–Ukraine border, 52 km west of Kursk, 13 km north-east of the district center – the town Lgov, 3.5 km from the selsoviet center – Gorodensk.

 Climate
Rechitsa has a warm-summer humid continental climate (Dfb in the Köppen climate classification).

Transport 
Rechitsa is located 10 km from the road of regional importance  (Kursk – Lgov – Rylsk – border with Ukraine) as part of the European route E38, on the road of intermunicipal significance  (Lgov – Gorodensk – Borisovka – Rechitsa), 9.5 km from the nearest railway station Blokhino (railway line Lgov I — Kursk).

The rural locality is situated 59 km from Kursk Vostochny Airport, 140 km from Belgorod International Airport and 262 km from Voronezh Peter the Great Airport.

References

Notes

Sources

Rural localities in Lgovsky District